Crash and Byrnes is a 2000 action film. It was independent developed and produced for Canadian television.

Brian Trenchard-Smith is credited as creative consultant.

Plot
Crash Riley, a drug enforcement agent is forced to team up with CIA agent Roman Byrnes. Although the personalities and working styles of the two agents are drastically different, they become good friends while on the trail of a notorious terrorist who's attempting to launch a deadly attack on a North American city.

Cast
Wolf Larson as Crash Riley
Greg Ellis as Roman Byrnes
Sandra Linguist
Joanna Pacula

References

External links

Crash and Byrnes at BFI
Crash and Byrnes at Letterbox DVD

2000 films
Canadian action films
English-language Canadian films
2000s English-language films
2000s Canadian films